During the 1997–98 English football season, Blackburn Rovers competed in the FA Premier League (known as the FA Carling Premiership for sponsorship reasons).

Season summary
After last season's slip-up, Blackburn Rovers emerged as title contenders under new manager Roy Hodgson, and even sixth place in the final table was enough for a UEFA Cup place. Never below seventh throughout the campaign, Rovers only lost two league matches before New Year as Hodgson picked up the Premier League Manager of the Month awards for both August and December, but faded in the second half of the campaign.

Chris Sutton's continued return to form saw him come joint top of the Premiership goalscoring charts with 18 goals, a Premier League Player of the Month award for February and led to him earning a long-awaited international call-up, though he didn't make the final squad for the World Cup after refusing to play for the England B team.

Final league table

Results summary

Results by round

Results
Blackburn Rovers' score comes first

Legend

FA Premier League

FA Cup

League Cup

Squad

Left club during season

Reserve squad

Transfers

In

Out

Transfers in:  £9,775,000
Transfers out:  £19,100,000
Total spending:  £9,325,000

Statistics

Starting 11
Considering starts in all competitions
 GK: #1,  Tim Flowers, 30
 RB: #3,  Jeff Kenna, 42
 CB: #5,  Colin Hendry, 39
 CB: #24,  Stéphane Henchoz, 40
 LB: #20,  Gary Croft, 24 (#11,  Jason Wilcox, has 27 starts)
 RM: #7,  Stuart Ripley, 28
 CM: #17,  Billy McKinlay, 31
 CM: #4,  Tim Sherwood, 34
 LM: #15,  Garry Flitcroft, 31
 CF: #8,  Kevin Gallacher, 35
 CF: #9,  Chris Sutton, 41

Notes

References

Blackburn Rovers F.C. seasons
Blackburn Rovers